R&F may refer to:
Ron and Fez, an American radio talk show hosted by Ron Bennington and Fez "Marie" Whatley
R&F Properties, a Chinese property developer
Guangzhou R&F F.C., a Chinese professional football club owned by R&F Properties
R&F F.C. (Hong Kong), a Hong Kong professional football club, satellite team of Guangzhou R&F F.C.